Hu Zhiqiang may refer to:

 Jason Hu (born 1948), Taiwanese politician
 Hu Zhiqiang (born 1963), Chinese politician, former Communist Party Secretary of Yulin
 Hu Zhiqiang (born 1962), Chinese politician, vice-chairman of Hubei Provincial People's Congress
 Hu Zhiqiang (diplomat), Chinese diplomat, Ambassador to Chad
 Hu Jhih-ciang (born 1997), Taiwanese actor